André Lagache (21 January 1885 – 2 October 1938) was a French racing driver who, along with René Léonard, won the inaugural 24 Hours of Le Mans in .

Career
Lagache and Léonard were engineers at automobile manufacturer Chenard et Walcker, and were chosen to drive their "Sport" model in the inaugural 24 Hours of Le Mans. Lagache continued to run Le Mans for Chenard et Walcker for the next two years, but was unable to finish the event again.

Lagache also raced a Chenard-Walcker in the inaugural Spa 24 Hours in 1924, finishing second alongside André Pisart. He returned with Léonard to win the event in 1925, and finished third with Léonard in 1926.

He was one of the founders of the tractor manufacturer FAR, and supplied the A to the company name. He was killed in an accident while demonstrating a vehicle in front of army officials in 1938.

Racing record

Complete 24 Hours of Le Mans results

External links 
André Lagache at racingsportscars.com.

References

French racing drivers
Grand Prix drivers
24 Hours of Le Mans drivers
24 Hours of Le Mans winning drivers
24 Hours of Spa drivers
Chevaliers of the Légion d'honneur
1885 births
1938 deaths
People from Pantin
Sportspeople from Seine-Saint-Denis